Kebrit (also Romanized as Kebrīt; also known as Kerbīt) is a village in Gavkhuni Rural District, Bon Rud District, Isfahan County, Isfahan Province, Iran. At the 2006 census, its population was 349, in 92 families.

References 

Populated places in Isfahan County